East Siang (Pron:/ˈsjæŋ or ˈsɪæŋ/) is an administrative district in the state of Arunachal Pradesh in India.

History
In 1989 territory was transferred from West Siang district to East Siang. A decade later, in 1999, the district was bifurcated to make Upper Siang district. East Siang district was first settled by Dibu-marang clans and was later driven away by some padam clan (subtribe of adi). Later padam clans accompanied it's close ally pasi and settled near padam mone and balek respectively. Later, due to epidemic (considered as spiritual) in the mone areas padams had to retreat.

Geography
The district headquarters are located at Pasighat.

Divisions
There are 5 Arunachal Pradesh Legislative Assembly constituencies located in this district: Panging, Nari-Koyu, Pasighat West, Pasighat East, and Mebo. All of these are part of Arunachal East Lok Sabha constituency. The district consists of 6 circles: Mebo, Namsing, Sile-Oyan, Pasighat, Bilat and Ruksin.

Demographics
According to the 2011 census East Siang district has a population of 99,214, roughly equal to the nation of Kiribati. This gives it a ranking of 615th in India (out of a total of 640). Its population growth rate over the decade 2001–2011 was 13.3%. East Siang has a sex ratio of 962 females for every 1000 males, and a literacy rate of 73.54%. After division, the residual district has a population of 70,956. Scheduled Tribes make up 46,334 which is 65.30% of the population.

Religion

Religions recorded as 'other' in the census, mainly Donyi-Polo, make up 32,728 which is 46.12% of the population. Hinduism is a sizeable minority religion which makes up 23,597 which is 33.26% of the population. Christians make up 11,249 which is 15.85% of the population. Muslims are 2,137 which is 3.01% of the population. Buddhists are 670 which is 0.94% of the population.

Various tribal groups of the Adi people live in various parts of the district. The local people traditionally follow Donyi-Polo, although a sizeable minority have converted to Christianity.

Languages
At the time of the 2011 census, 62.78% of the population spoke Adi, 12.17% Nepali, 8.29% Hindi, 5.12% Bengali, 4.82% Bhojpuri, 3.34% Assamese, 1.80% Mishing and 1.32% Boro as their first language.

Flora and fauna

References

External links 

 

 
Districts of Arunachal Pradesh
1989 establishments in Arunachal Pradesh